Brandon Knupp (born February 2, 1986) is an American former stock car racing driver. He last competed in the NASCAR Camping World Truck Series.

Racing career
Knupp competed in 27 NASCAR Gander Outdoors Truck Series races between 2007 and 2012. His best career finish was an 18th at Daytona International Speedway in 2007. 

Knupp also competed in a total of 51 ARCA Racing Series events between 2004 and 2008, reaching the top ten 8 times.

He also attempted one NASCAR Nationwide Series event, driving the No. 75 Chevrolet for Bob Schacht Motorsports but due to a crash in practice he withdrew.

Motorsports career results

NASCAR
(key) (Bold – Pole position awarded by qualifying time. Italics – Pole position earned by points standings or practice time. * – Most laps led.)

Nationwide Series

Camping World Truck Series

ARCA Re/Max Series
(key) (Bold – Pole position awarded by qualifying time. Italics – Pole position earned by points standings or practice time. * – Most laps led.)

References

External links
 

1986 births
NASCAR drivers
Living people
Racing drivers from Ohio
ARCA Menards Series drivers
People from Sidney, Ohio